Susan Vaught (born October 22, 1965) is an American author and neuropsychologist.

Biography 
Vaught received a Bachelor of Arts degree from the University of Mississippi and a Master of Science from Vanderbilt University. In 1991, she graduated from Vanderbilt with a Doctor of Philosophy in Clinical Psychology and Intellectual/ Developmental Disabilities Research. Since graduation, she has worked as a neuropsychologist, including serving as the Director of Neuropsychology and the Clinical Director for a hospital in Tennessee.

Vaught is autistic. She presently lives in Kentucky with her wife.

Awards and honors 
In 1996, Vaught received the SEAAMR Richard B. Dillard Award For Research In The Field Of Developmental Disabilities.

Footer Davis Probably Is Crazy (2015), Super Max and the Mystery of Thornwood’s Revenge (2017), and Me and Sam-Sam Handle the Apocalypse (2019), are Junior Library Guild selections. Bank Street College of Education named Footer Davis Probably Is Crazy one of the "Best Children’s Books of 2016." Trigger received a starred review from Booklist and Publishers Weekly. Things Too Huge to Fix by Saying Sorry received Booklist, Kirkus Reviews, and Publishers Weekly. Me and Sam-Sam Handle the Apocalypse received a starred review from Booklist. Publishers Weekly named it one of the best books published in the summer of 2019. Together We Grow received starred reviews from Booklist, Kirkus Reviews, Publishers Weekly, and School Library Journal.

Publications

Children's 

 Footer Davis Probably Is Crazy (2015)
 Things Too Huge to Fix by Saying Sorry (2016)
 Super Max and the Mystery of Thornwood's Revenge (2017)
 Me and Sam-Sam Handle the Apocalypse (2019)
 Together We Grow, illustrated by Kelly Murphy  (2020)

Young adult 

 Fat Tuesday (2004)
 Stormwitch (2005)
 Trigger (2006)
 Big Fat Manifesto (2007)
 Exposed (2008)
 Assassin's Apprentice (2010)
 Going Underground (2011)
 Freaks Like Us (2012)
 Insanity (2014)

L.O.S.T. series 
The L.O.S.T. series was co-written with R. S. Collins and Debbie Federici.

 L.O.S.T. (2004)
 Shadowqueen (2005)
 Witch Circle (2006)

External links' 

 Official website

References 

1965 births
University of Mississippi alumni
Vanderbilt University alumni
21st-century American women writers
Living people
People on the autism spectrum
American LGBT novelists
LGBT women